Mount Fairy is a locality in the Queanbeyan–Palerang Regional Council, New South Wales, Australia. It is located to the east of the Bungendore–Tarago road.

Mount Fairy had a railway station on the Bombala railway line from 1886 to 1975. Its original name was Fairy Meadow, the name of the parish lying south of Merigan (which includes most of Mount Fairy) in the Mulloon area, but it was renamed to its current name in 1903.

For many years, Mount Fairy was the site of a quarry, where dolomite was obtained for use in the iron and steel industry at Port Kembla.

Mount Fairy had a state school from 1910 to 1931 and from 1946 to 1951, which generally operated as a "provisional" school, but it was a "half-time" school from 1929 to 1931.

References

Localities in New South Wales
Queanbeyan–Palerang Regional Council
Southern Tablelands